Vainajala (1998) is an album by the Finnish rock group CMX. Vainaja is Finnish for a dead person, Vainajala meaning a name of a place inhabited by the dead.

The style that Vainajala was produced was highly exceptional; The band went to a small cottage in the middle of Lapland with mobile recording equipment and producer Billy Gould, who had previously shown interest in the band largely unknown outside Finland. Recording Vainajala took only two weeks, much less than the recording time for any of their other recent albums. The album was later finished at the Herodes studio in Helsinki, but the musical style of the album is still very minimalistic. Only a few visiting artists performed on the album.

Track listing
All songs written by CMX with lyrics by A. W. Yrjänä.

 "Iskusävelmä" – 3:38 ("Hit Song") 
 "Surunmurhaaja" – 3:47  ("Murderer of Sorrow") 
 "Vainajala" – 6:07 
 "Vierasta viljaa" – 4:14  ("Foreign Grain") 
 "Ei yksikään" – 3:26  ("Not One")  
 "Taivaan lapset" – 3:50  ("Children of Heaven") 
 "Sillanrakentaja" – 4:14  ("Bridgebuilder") 
 "Laulu palavasta linnusta" – 4:00  ("Song about a Burning Bird") 
 "Eufrat" – 1:29
 "Kirjeitä paratiisista" – 3:56  ("Letters from Paradise") 
 "Arkangeli" – 3:17  ("Arkhangelsk")  
 "Vanha talvitie" – 5:59 ("Old Winter Road")

The band
 A. W. Yrjänä – vocals, bass guitar
 Janne Halmkrona – guitars
 Timo Rasio – guitars
 Tuomas Peippo – drums

Guests
 Billy Gould – producer
 Martti Salminen – keyboard, vocals
 Susanna Eronen – vocals
 Teropekka Virtanen – recording, mixing
 Mika Jussila – mastering
 Janne Uotila – sleeve design

Singles
 "Ei yksikään" / "Linnunhammas (live)" (October 1998)
 "Sillanrakentaja" / "Punainen nro 6" (November 1998)
 "Surunmurhaaja" / "π" / "Aivosähköä (live)" (March 1999)

CMX (band) albums
1998 albums